Deh Beh is a village in Fathabad Rural District, in the Central District of Qir and Karzin County, Fars Province, Iran. At the 2006 census, its population was 1,264, in 298 families.

References 

Populated places in Qir and Karzin County